Four Days in Paris (French: Quatre jours à Paris) is a 1955 French musical comedy film directed by André Berthomieu and starring Luis Mariano, Geneviève Kervine and Jane Sourza. It was shot in Eastmancolor at the Boulogne Studios in Paris. The film's sets were designed by the art director Raymond Nègre. It is based on the 1948 operetta of the same title composed by Francis Lopez.

Synopsis
It follows a series of characters including Mario, a fashionable Paris hairdresser in need of money, his girlfriend Gisèle, friend Nicolas and a wealthy American heiress who is sold a fake rejuvenation serum. Mario then falls in love with Gabrielle, a Southerner, and all the characters head for the hotel she owns on the Riviera.

Cast
 Luis Mariano as 	Mario
 Roger Nicolas as 	Nicolas
 Jane Sourza as Rita Alvarez
 Geneviève Kervine as 	Gabrielle
 Andrex as Le brigadier
 Fernand Sardou as 	Montaron
 Gisèle Robert as Gisèle
 Arthur Allan as 	Alvarez
 Jackie Sardou as 	Zénaïde 
 Gaston Orbal as Hyacinthe
 Nina Myra as L'habilleuse
 Luc Andrieux as Le gendarme
 Darry Cowl as L'aviculteur

References

Bibliography
 Rège, Philippe. Encyclopedia of French Film Directors, Volume 1. Scarecrow Press, 2009.
 Shiri, Keith. Directory of African Film-makers and Films. Greenwood Press, 1992.

External links 
 

1955 films
1955 musical comedy films
French musical comedy films
1950s French-language films
Films directed by André Berthomieu
Operetta films
Films shot at Boulogne Studios
Films set in Paris
1950s French films